Małoszyce  is a village in the administrative district of Gmina Sadowie, within Opatów County, Świętokrzyskie Voivodeship, in south-central Poland.

 
The village has a population of 90.

Małoszyce is the birthplace of writer Witold Gombrowicz (1904–1969).

References

Villages in Opatów County